The Australia men's national pitch and putt team represents Australia in the pitch and putt international competitions. It is managed by the Australian Pitch and Putt Association (APPA).

Australian Pitch and Putt Association is one of the founders of the Federation of International Pitch and Putt Associations (FIPPA).

Australia reached the 8th place in the 2008 Pitch and putt World Cup.

Stewart Genge fell victim to Harry Karabalis trying to defend his Australian title. Karabalis hit an immaculate 6-under with Genge finishing 4 under.

National team

Players
National team in the World Cup 2009
 Joshua May
 Paul Johnston
 Rebecca Ferrington

National team in the World Cup 2008
 James Rogerson
 Stewart Genge
 Marie Hutchison

National team in the World Cup 2006
Eero Tarik
Brian Kirkby 
Annegret Green

See also
World Cup Team Championship

External links
APPA Australian Pitch and Putt Association
FIPPA Federation of International Pitch and Putt Associations website

National pitch and putt teams
Pitch and putt